Bacchus is the Roman name for Dionysus, the god of wine and intoxication.

Bacchus may also refer to:

Art and entertainment
 Bacchus (Leonardo), a painting by Leonardo da Vinci of John the Baptist
 Bacchus (Michelangelo), a marble sculpture by Michelangelo
 Bacchus (Jacopo Sansovino), a sculpture by Jacopo Sansovino
 Bacchus (Caravaggio), a painting by Caravaggio
 Bacchus (Rubens), a painting by Rubens
 Bacchus (opera), a 1909 opera by Jules Massenet 
 Bacchus (play), a 1951 play by Jean Cocteau
 Bacchus and Ariadne (disambiguation)

People
 Faoud Bacchus (born 1954), Guyanese cricketer
 James Bacchus (born 1949), American politician and former member of the Appellate Body of the World Trade Organization
 Kamara Bacchus (born 1986), British actress and radio personality
 Saint Bacchus (3rd century), Roman soldier commemorated as a Christian martyr

Places
 Temple of Bacchus, a Roman temple at a large classical antiquity complex in Baalbek, Lebanon
 Bakos, Alexandria, a neighborhood in Alexandria, Egypt
 Bacchus Marsh, Victoria, a town in Victoria, Australia
 Bacchus, Utah, a ghost town in Salt Lake County, Utah, United States

Military
 Project Bacchus, a covert investigation into bioweapons production with off-the-shelf equipment
 RFA Bacchus, the name of three ships of the Royal Fleet Auxiliary

Other uses
 2063 Bacchus, an asteroid
 Bacchus (character), a comics character created by Eddie Campbell
 Bacchus (comics), comics character created by Eddie Campbell
 Bacchus (grape), white wine grape variety grown in Germany and England
 Bacchus (train), an express train in Germany 1979–1998
 Bacchus Motorcycle Club, an outlaw motorcycle club in Canada
 Bacchus-F, an energy drink from South Korea
 Krewe of Bacchus, an organization that parades during the New Orleans Mardi Gras
 Bacchus Wrath or King Mondo, a fictional character from the American television series Power Rangers Zeo

See also 
 
 Backus (disambiguation)
 Backhaus, a surname
 Bacchylus